League Teams (formerly known as AFL Teams) was a weekly Australian sports television series based on the Australian Football League (AFL) that airs on Fox Footy. It was shown on Thursdays at 6:30pm, to coincide with that round's team announcements. Hosted by Dermott Brereton, it also featured members of the Fox Footy's commentary team every week during the AFL season.

A predecessor show with the same name and same general format was screened by HSV-7 in Melbourne in the 1960s and 1970s. It featured a panel of three well known former players, Lou Richards, Jack Dyer and Bob Davis. It was shown late on Thursday nights during the football season.

History
The show was launched on the original iteration of Fox Footy Channel in 2002, and was hosted by Jason Dunstall. The show's panellists were Luke Darcy, former  and  player John Barnes, and former  player Wayne Schwass. The show finished at the end of the 2006 season when Fox Footy Channel ceased operations, and it moved to parent channel Fox Sports. It continued there until 2012, when Fox Footy was launched and the show returned to an AFL-dedicated channel.

From 2007 to 2010, it was hosted by former footballer Brian Taylor. He was replaced by Dermott Brereton following the 2011 season, after Taylor's departure to the Seven Network.

The show had changed format 2017 when Paul Roos joined Brereton on the show with the format changed to a “match committee” style.

The show was axed in 2018 and was replaced by The Weekend Lowdown which was hosted by Sarah Olle, with most of those who appeared on League Teams except Brereton and Roos appearing on the show.

Host
Jason Dunstall (2002–2006)
Brian Taylor (2007-2011)
Dermott Brereton (2012–2017)
Paul Roos (2017)

Panellists
 Brad Johnson
 Alastair Lynch
 Ben Dixon
Luke Darcy
John Barnes
Wayne Schwass
Tony Shaw
Barry Hall
David Parkin
Cameron Mooney
Liam Pickering
Paul Roos

See also

 List of Australian television series
 List of longest-running Australian television series

References

External links
 

Fox Sports (Australian TV network) original programming
Fox Footy original programming
2002 Australian television series debuts
2010s Australian television series
Australian rules football television series